Eucithara lota is a small sea snail, a marine gastropod mollusk in the family Mangeliidae.

The holotype of the species was destroyed in the Great Chicago fire.

Description
The length of the shell attains 5 mm.

Distribution
This marine species occurs off China

References

External links
  Tucker, J.K. 2004 Catalog of recent and fossil turrids (Mollusca: Gastropoda). Zootaxa 682:1-1295
 

lota
Gastropods described in 1860